Digby Jones  is a British musician and producer. He has written music which has appeared on albums such as Cafe Del Mar Vol.8 and Cafe Del Mar Vol 11, as well as in US TV shows such as The OC and ER, and commercials for companies such as Sony PlayStation, Banana Republic and British Airways. His music is mainly jazzy and funky, but he also produces other styles.

He is also the founder of Sublime Music in London, which producers and publishes music from other artists around the world. The company has music placed in popular films such as Tropic Thunder, trailers such as Madagascar, US TV shows including CSI, Greys Anatomy, Nip Tuck, Without A Trace, as well as commercials for clients such as Microsoft, Gap, Kenco, P&O, Chevrolet, E&J Gallo and Kia Cars.

References
 Tropic Thunder soundtrack
 The OC Show website
 Digby Jones myspace page
 Digby Jones music on Youtube

External links
 Official Digby Jones website
 Sublime Music website
 Cafe Del Mar website

British record producers
Living people
Year of birth missing (living people)
Place of birth missing (living people)
British composers